Frank Schreiner (March 24, 1879 – July 6, 1937) was an American water polo player. He competed in the men's tournament at the 1904 Summer Olympics, and was part of the team that won the bronze medal.

References

External links
 

1879 births
1937 deaths
American male water polo players
Olympic water polo players of the United States
Water polo players at the 1904 Summer Olympics
Sportspeople from St. Louis
Olympic medalists in water polo
Medalists at the 1904 Summer Olympics
Olympic bronze medalists for the United States in water polo
19th-century American people
20th-century American people